Countesthorpe Academy (formerly Countesthorpe Leysland Community College) is a coeducational secondary school situated on the western edge of Countesthorpe in Leicestershire, England near the A426.

History
Countesthorpe Leysland Community College was formed in 2016 by the merger of Countesthorpe Community College and neighbouring Leysland High School. Countesthorpe Community College was established in 1970 with Tim McMullen as its first head, or warden, followed in 1972 by John Watts as head teacher. They both developed it as a progressive "open school".

The school previously formed part of The South Leicestershire Learning Partnership, a multi-academy umbrella trust. In March 2020 the school joined the LIFE Multi-Academy Trust and was renamed Countesthorpe Academy, and is now led by Executive Head Gareth Williams.

Facilities
The school occupies the buildings previously used by its predecessor institutions. The former Countesthorpe Community College buildings are notable for their circular plan.  The architect was John Barton of Farmer and Dark.  The sculpture that was previously in the middle of the courtyard is one of three versions of Dunstable Reel by Phillip King.

The seniors department of Birkett House School is located on the site of Countesthorpe Academy and its students attend lessons at the school and use its sports and catering facilities.

Concerns and criticisms
In July 2019 Countesthorpe Leysland Community College was judged to be "inadequate" by Ofsted. During the inspection, inspectors found serious failings in safeguarding and pupil well being, they discovered that many students feel unsafe at school, found poor behaviour exhibited by a significant group of pupils and they identified shortcomings in the quality of leadership offered by the senior leadership team.

Concerns were also raised about the poor quality of toilet facilities available at the college, which have since been refurbished  which was reported in both local and national media.

Notable former pupils
The band members of Kasabian are ex-students of the school. The school is mentioned by name in the BBC comedy series Big School, in series two, episode four, during a question and answer session about Kasabian.
Harvey Barnes, professional footballer
Pete Morton, singer songwriter
 Kev Reverb, guitarist in Crazyhead
Wayne Dobson, magician/entertainer
Mary Byker, singer of Gaye Bykers on Acid, Apollo 440, Pigface, Hyperhead, Rektum and Pop Will Eat Itself

References

Further reading
J. F. Watts (1977), The Countesthorpe Experience (Allen & Unwin),

External links
Countesthorpe Academy official website

Secondary schools in Leicestershire
Academies in Leicestershire
Educational institutions established in 1974
1974 establishments in England
Educational institutions established in 2016
2016 establishments in England